Haramiyida is a possibly polyphyletic order of mammaliaform cynodonts or mammals of controversial taxonomic affinites. Their teeth, which are by far the most common remains, resemble those of the multituberculates. However, based on Haramiyavia, the jaw is less derived; and at the level of evolution of earlier basal mammals like Morganucodon and Kuehneotherium, with a groove for ear ossicles on the dentary. If they are early multituberculates, they would be the longest lived mammalian clade of all time. However, a more recent study in November 2015 may dispute this and suggested the Haramiyida were not crown mammals, but were part of an earlier offshoot of mammaliaformes instead. It is also disputed whether the Late Triassic species are closely related to the Jurassic and Cretaceous members belonging to Euharamiyida/Eleutherodontida, as some phylogenetic studies recover the two groups as unrelated, recovering the Triassic haramiyidians as non-mammalian cynodonts, while recovering the Euharamiyida as crown-group mammals closely related to multituberculates.

Relationships

Haramiyids show certain similarities to multituberculates, a group of mammals that survived until about 40 million years ago. It is possible that haramiyids are ancestral to multituberculates, although the available evidence is insufficient to be conclusive. Certain characteristics of the teeth seem to rule out a special relationship between the two groups, although some studies still unite haramiyids (or at least euharamiyids) and multituberculates in the Allotheria hypothesis.

In a 2018 study, haramiyidans have been found to be a monophyletic group of non-mammalian Mammaliaformes. In this study, gondwanatheres – usually interpreted as mammals, and derived multituberculates in particular – have been found to be deeply nested among them.

Taxonomy

Order †Haramiyida Hahn, Sigogneau-Russell & Wouters, 1989 [Haramiyoidea Hahn, 1973 sensu McKenna & Bell, 1997]
 †Kirtlingtonia Butler & Hooker, 2005
Family †Haramiyaviidae Butler, 2000
 †Haramiyavia Jenkins et al., 1997
Family †Theroteinidae Sigogneau-Russell, Frank & Hammerle, 1986
 †Theroteinus nikolai Sigogneau-Russell, Frank & Hammerle, 1986
 †Theroteinus rosieriensis Sigogneau-Russell, 2016
Family †Haramiyidae Poche, 1908 [Haramiyidae Simpson, 1947 sensu Jenkins et al., 1997; Microlestidae Murry, 1866; Microcleptidae Simpson, 1928]
 †Eoraetica
Hypsiprymnopsis rhaeticus Dawkins, 1864 [Microlestes rhaeticus Dawkins, 1864]
 †Avashishta bacharamensis Anantharaman et al., 2006
 ?†Allostaffia aenigmatica (Heinrich, 1999) Heinrich 2004 [Staffia Heinrich, 1999 non Schubert, 1911; Staffia aenigmatica Heinrich, 1999]; possible, gondwanathere instead.
 †Thomasia Poche, 1908 [Haramiya Simpson, 1947; Microlestes Plieninger, 1847 non Schmidt-Goebel, 1846; Microcleptes Simpson, 1928 non Newman, 1840; Plieningeria Krausse, 1919; Stathmodon Henning, 1911]
 †T. woutersi Butler & MacIntyre, 1994
 †T. hahni Butler & MacIntyre, 1994
 †T. moorei (Owen 1871) Butler & MacIntyre, 1994 [Haramiya moorei (Owen, 1871) Simpson, 1947; Microleptes moorei Owen, 1871; Microcleptes moorei (Owen, 1871) Simpson, 1928]
 †T. antiqua (Plieninger, 1847) Poche 1908 [Microlestes antiquus Plieninger, 1847; Haramiya antiqua (Plieninger, 1847); Microleptes fissurae Simpson, 1928; Haramiya fissurae (Simpson 1928); Haramiya butleri Sigogneau-Russell, 1990; Thomasia anglica Simpson, 1928] 
†Hahnodontidae Sigogneau-Russell, 1991
†Cifelliodon wahkarmoosuch Huttenlocker et al., 2018
† Denisodon
† Hahnodon taqueti Sigogneau-Russell, 1991

†Euharamiyida Bi et al., 1994
?†Gondwanatheria Mones, 1987

Lifestyle

Haramiyids seem to have generally been herbivorous or omnivorous, possibly the first mammalian herbivores; however, the sole haramiyid tested in a study involving Mesozoic mammal dietary habits, Haramiyavia, ranks among insectivorous species. At least some species were very good climbers and were similar to modern day squirrels; and several others have more recently been reassessed as possibly arboreal. General arboreal habits might explain their rarity in the fossil record.

Several haramiyidans, Maiopatagium, Xianshou, Vilevolodon and Arboroharamiya, took it one step further and developed the ability to glide, having extensive membranes similar to those of modern colugos. In many of these taxa, the coracoid bones (absent in modern therians but present in many other mammal groups, albeit highly reduced) are remarkably large and similar to those of birds and pterosaurs, presumably due to impact stresses at landing.

Mammalian tooth marks on dinosaur bones may belong to Sineleutherus, suggesting that some haramiyidans scavenged on dinosaur remains.

Range

The fossils of Late Triassic Haramiyids are primarily known from Europe and Greenland, while the fossils of Euharamiyids are primarily known from the Middle to Late Jurassic of Asia. Remains of eleutherodontids from Europe are only known from isolated teeth.

The youngest haramiyid fossil genus has been considered to be possibly be Avashishta bacharamensis from the Maastrichtian of India, however, this has not been robustly assessed by phylogenetics. The youngest definitive euharamiyidan is Cryoharamiya from the Early Creatceous Batylykh Formation of Yakutia, Russia.

Notes

References
 Zofia Kielan-Jaworowska, Richard L. Cifelli, and Zhe-Xi Luo, Mammals from the Age of Dinosaurs: Origins, Evolution, and Structure (New York: Columbia University Press, 2004), 249–260.

External links
 Palaeos, Mammaliaformes: Allotheria
 John H Burkitt, Mammals, A World Listing of Living and Extinct Species. Archived from the original on 21 December 2004. Retrieved 2015-06-18.
 Mikko K Haaramo, Haramiyida

 
Late Triassic synapsids
Jurassic synapsids
Transitional fossils
Norian first appearances
Middle Jurassic extinctions
Taxa named by Gerhard Hahn (palaeontologist)
Taxa named by Denise Sigogneau‐Russell